Funk Plus The One is the second album by Jerome Brailey and his Funk band Mutiny. The album was released by Columbia Records in 1980. In 1994 the album was reissued by P-Vine records in Japan and contains one extra track entitled "I'm Ready". The album also features a guest appearance by P-Funk bassist/guitarist Cordell Mosson. In 2015 it was reissued in the U.S. by Funky Town Grooves as a two-CD set with their debut album Mutiny On The Mamaship without "I'm Ready," but with three other bonus tracks.

Track listing
All tracks composed by Jerome Brailey; except where indicated

2015 Funky Town Grooves Bonus Tracks:

Personnel
Jerome Brailey, Skitch Lovett, James Hockaday - lead vocals
Jerome Brailey, Skitch Lovett, Keni Hairston, Lenny Holmes - background vocals
Jerome Brailey - drums, percussion
Skitch Lovett, Cordell Mosson, Lenny Holmes - guitar
Keni Hairston, Nat Lee - keyboards
James Hockaday, Daryl Jones - bass
Daryl Dixon, Melvin El, Marvin Daniels, David Watson - horns

References 

Mutiny (funk band) albums
1980 albums
Columbia Records albums